The Saugus Advertiser is the oldest newspaper covering the town of Saugus, Massachusetts still in print. It is the newspaper of record in Saugus as it is currently the only place Saugus legal notices are printed.

History
The Saugus Advertiser was founded by Colonel Alfred Woodward in 1946. He remained the newspaper's publisher until his death in 1970. He was succeeded by his wife, Virginia. In 1983 she sold the paper to Andrew P. Quigley, who also published the Chelsea Record, the Winthrop Sun Transcript and the East Boston Sun-Transcript. It was later purchased by Neil P. Collins and Mary L. N. McGrew. In 1990 they sold the paper to North Shore Weeklies. In 1996, North Shore Weeklies was dissolved by its parent company, Community Newspaper Company. CNC was later purchased by GateHouse Media, who dissolved CNC into GateHouse Media New England in 2011.

References

Saugus, Massachusetts
Mass media in Essex County, Massachusetts
Saugus Advertiser